The 1933 National League was the fifth season of speedway in the United Kingdom.

Summary
Sheffield and Nottingham joined the league but the Stamford Bridge Pensioners dropped out. The National Association Trophy was dropped in favour of expanding the National League, with teams meeting each other home and away twice instead of once.

Belle Vue Aces won their first national title and completed the double by winning the Knockout Cup. Jack Parker of Clapton Saints finished with the highest average although Vic Huxley of Wimbledon Dons scored the most points

Final table

Top Ten Riders

National Trophy
The 1933 National Trophy was the third edition of the Knockout Cup.

Preliminary round

First round

Semifinals

a=abandoned

Final

First leg

Second leg

Belle Vue were National Trophy Champions, winning on aggregate 164-87.

See also
List of United Kingdom Speedway League Champions
Knockout Cup (speedway)

References

Speedway National League
1933 in speedway
1933 in British motorsport